Pierre Auger may refer to:

 Pierre Victor Auger (1899–1993), French physicist
 Pierre Auger (biologist) (born 1953), French bio-mathematician
 Pierre-Michel Auger (born 1963), Canadian politician